As Simple as That (Be Hamin Sādegi) is a 2008 Iranian drama film directed by Reza Mirkarimi. It won the Golden George at the 30th Moscow International Film Festival. As Simple as That marks a milestone in current Iranian cinema as a rare realist depiction of a woman from the middle class.

Cast
 Hengameh Ghaziani
 Safa Aghajani
 Parvaneh Ahmadi
 Ahmad Akeshteh
 Nastaran Hamdam Ali
 Nayereh Farahani
 Nireh Farhani
 Nastaran Hamdamali
 Haleh Homapour
 Mohsen Hosseini
 Mohammad Jafar Jafarpour
 Mehran Kashani
 Behnoosh Khaleghi
 Behnoosh Sadeghi

References

External links
 
 Movie in Rotten Tomatoes

2008 films
2008 drama films
2000s Persian-language films
Iranian drama films
Crystal Simorgh for Best Film winners
Films whose writer won the Best Screenplay Crystal Simorgh
Films directed by Reza Mirkarimi